The 2022 African Fencing Championships was held at the Casablanca’s Salle Couverte du Complexe Sportif Mohamed V in  Casablanca, Morocco from 15-19 June 2022.

Medal summary

Men's events

Women's events

Medal table
 Host

References

2022
African Fencing Championships
International sports competitions hosted by Morocco
2022 in Moroccan sport
Fencing competitions in Morocco
June 2022 sports events in Africa